Buena Park High School (BPHS) is a public high school located at 8833 Academy Drive in Buena Park, Orange County, California, USA.

History
Buena Park High School opened its doors with 508 students on September 11, 1956, as the third school in the Fullerton Joint Union High School District. The school was made possible by a bond issue voted by citizens in the FJUHSD to serve students in Buena Park and west Fullerton.

Under the leadership of its first principal, Richard Spaulding, the enrollment increased to 2,900. Dr. John Machisic succeeded Spaulding in 1974, and served in that capacity until 1975. The BPHS student body recognized Richard Spaulding for his many years of service as principal by renaming the football stadium in his honor. Dr. Jack Holm followed Dr. Machisic for the next seven years until 1983, when Jim Bremer, a BPHS graduate (1960) began his tenure at Buena Park. Dr. George Giokaris assumed the responsibilities of principal from 1987 to 1989; Christine Hoffman served from 1989 to 1992; and Tom Triggs served from 1992 to 1998. Dr. Michael Conroy served from 1998 to 2001. Maggie Buchan served from 2001 to 2006. Dr. Benjamin Wolf served from 2006 to 2009. Jim Coombs served as principal from the summer of 2010 until Sonje Berg took office January 3, 2017. All of these leaders, including the assistant principals, have given their time, energy and creative talents to mold BPHS into the fine school it is today.

Since 1967, Buena Park High School has undergone the accreditation process eight times. Most recently, the school went through the process in 2016-2017. Under the supervision of the Western Association of Schools and colleges, an intensive review was completed of every facet of the school's operation. A full six-year accreditation was awarded to Buena Park High School which certifies to all other educational institutions that the high school meets all standards set for high quality schools and that credits and grades earned by its graduates are based on quality criteria.

Buena Park High School enjoys high status in academics, athletics and the performing arts. High performance standards in the classroom, in competitive sports, and in artistic productions have earned an outstanding reputation.

Athletics 

Buena Park's sports teams are known as the Coyotes, and are members of the CIF Southern Section. They compete in the Freeway League against the other five high schools in the district.
The 2001 football team made it to the D3 CIF Championship game and lost to Brea Olinda.
In addition, The 2008 water polo team placed second in the freeway league and advanced to the CIF quarter finals.
The 2009 Girls' Varsity Tennis team advanced to CIF for the first time in BPHS history. The Cross Country team also advanced to CIF for the first time in almost 20 years under the leadership of Barry Migliorini. The Cross Country team swept the freeway league titles for the Frosh off and JV levels, varsity came  in second losing to Troy high school. In 2011, they won the league title and went on to the CIF SS finals and one individual boy, Gilberto Solorza, advancing to the state finals in cross country. Cross Country is also one of the most winning sports in Buena Park, followed by Wrestling, Water Polo, and Football. In 2016, the Varsity football team was undefeated and went on to CIF. In 2019, the cross country team would make their 18th appearance at the CIF championship. As for the women's cross country team, this would mark their third CIF appearance since 1997.

Notable alumni

Harry Anderson — Actor, comedian, and magician (most well known for Night Court)
Nathan Baesel – Actor
Jaylinn Hawkins — Football player for the Atlanta Falcons
K. W. Jeter — Author
Francisco "Cisco" Rivera — professional Mixed Martial Arts, current UFC #11 Bantamweight Contender
Nik Needham — Football player for the Miami Dolphins
Dave Rowland — Lead singer of the band Dave & Sugar
Steven Seagal — Actor, producer, writer, director, martial artist, guitarist, and deputy sheriff
Josh Tupou — Football player for the Cincinnati Bengals
Zachary Zorn — Freestyle swimming world record holder and Olympic gold medalist (1968)

References

External links
 Buena Park High School official site

Educational institutions established in 1956
High schools in Orange County, California
Buena Park, California
Public high schools in California
1956 establishments in California